Gordon Park Baker (born at Englewood, New Jersey, 20 April 1938; died at Woodstock, Oxfordshire, 25 June 2002) was an American-English philosopher. His topics of interest included Ludwig Wittgenstein, Gottlob Frege, Friedrich Waismann, Bertrand Russell, the Vienna Circle, and René Descartes. He was noted for his collaboration with Peter Hacker and his disagreements with Michael Dummett.

Biography
Baker was educated at Phillips Exeter Academy, Harvard University (major in mathematics), and, as a Marshall Scholar, at The Queen's College, Oxford, where he intended to read Philosophy, Politics, and Economics but transferred to Literae Humaniores (1960). He pursued his doctorate (1963–70) while teaching at the University of Kent and latterly as a Fellow of St John's College, Oxford.

He was a Trustee of the Waismann Fund.

His other interests included real tennis and the harpsichord.

He was married to Ann Pimlott (1964), with whom he had three sons: Alan, Geoffrey, and Nicholas. Alan is currently a professor of philosophy at Swarthmore College. From 1992 until Gordon Baker's death the philosopher Katherine Morris (Mansfield College, Oxford) was his acknowledged companion.

Bibliography
 Wittgenstein : Understanding and Meaning, Volume 1 of an analytical commentary on the Philosophical Investigations (Blackwell, Oxford, and Chicago University Press, Chicago, 1980), co-authored with P.M.S Hacker.
 Frege : Logical Excavations, (Blackwell, Oxford, O.U.P., N.Y., 1984) co-authored with P.M.S Hacker.
 Language, Sense and Nonsense, a critical investigation into modern theories of language (Blackwell, 1984) co-authored with P.M.S Hacker.
 Scepticism, Rules and Language (Blackwell, 1984) co-authored with P.M.S Hacker.
 Wittgenstein : Rules, Grammar, and Necessity - Volume 2 of an analytical commentary on the Philosophical Investigations (Blackwell, Oxford, UK and Cambridge, Massachusetts USA, 1985) co-authored with P.M.S Hacker.
 Wittgenstein's Method: Neglected Aspects. Oxford: Blackwell, 2004., posthumously edited and published by Katherine J. Morris.

See also
American philosophy
List of American philosophers

References

1938 births
2002 deaths
20th-century American philosophers
Barker, Gordon Park
Alumni of The Queen's College, Oxford
Analytic philosophers
Harvard College alumni
Marshall Scholars
People from Englewood, New Jersey
Phillips Exeter Academy alumni
Philosophers of language
Wittgensteinian philosophers